Football is one of the most famous games in Sri Lanka just behind cricket. Most football clubs are based in main cities like Colombo, Kandy, Negambo and Kalutara. There are five football competitions in Sri Lanka. They are Sri Lanka Football Premier League, Division I, Division II, Division III, Sri Lanka FA Cup and Dialog champions league

A
Air Force SC - Kelaniya

B
Blue Star SC - Kalutara
Berberyn SC - Beruwala
al aqsha SC - Bandarawela

C
Colombo FC - Colombo

D
Don Bosco SC - Negombo

J
Java Lane SC - Colombo

K
Kalutara Park SC - Kalutara
KB Football Club - Dharga Town

N
Navy SC - Football team of Sri Lanka Navy
New Rome - Negombo
New Young's SC - Wennappuwa

P
Pelicans SC - Kurunegala
Police SC - Colombo

R
Ratnam SC - Colombo
Real SC - Ratmalana
Renown SC - Colombo

S
Saunders SC - Colombo
Solid SC - Anuradhapura
Super Sun SC - Beruwala

U
Up Country Lions SC - Nawalapitiya

V
Victory SC - Trincomalee

Z
Zavia SC - Dharga Town

External links
 Official website
 Sri Lanka at the FIFA website.
 Sri Lanka at the AFC website.
 
 
 
 

Sri Lanka
 
Football clubs
Football clubs